No Vacancy – The Best of The Motels is a compilation album by the new wave band, The Motels released in 1990. This album was released in United States, manufactured for BMG Direct Marketing.  The album is a re-labeled version of No Reservations, which was released in Australia two years previously.

Track listing

Charts

References 

1990 compilation albums
The Motels albums